is a kilometer-sized Apollo asteroid and potentially hazardous object orbiting between Venus and Jupiter. It was discovered on 13 January 2022 by Scott Sheppard at Cerro Tololo Observatory. Based on its absolute magnitude (H),  is likely the largest potentially hazardous object identified in the eight years prior to its 2022 discovery.

Discovery 
 was discovered as part of Sheppard's twilight survey for near-Earth asteroids interior to Earth and Venus, using Cerro Tololo Observatory's Dark Energy Camera.

Orbit and classification 
 is considered "potentially hazardous" only because of its large size and low Earth minimum orbit intersection distance (MOID) just within . However, the asteroid does not currently make notable close approaches to Earth because it is in a 1:5 near orbital resonance with Earth, which means it nearly takes exactly 5.0 years to orbit the Sun in a highly elliptical orbit. This resonance regularly puts it in positions where observational conditions are unfavorable; the asteroid is obscured by the Sun's glare when it becomes brightest near perihelion at low solar elongations and can be fainter at opposition when it is farther from Earth. As a result,  could only be efficiently searched at twilight when at its brightest; the asteroid was 45 degrees from the Sun and 1.9 AU from Earth when it was discovered. The asteroid made its closest approach 1.5 AU from Earth in March 2022. The asteroid will not come this close to Earth again until March 2027. By May 2022, when the asteroid was 1 AU from the Sun and near the ecliptic, Earth was on the other side of the Sun, 1.9 AU from the asteroid. 

The asteroid is not risk listed. 's orbit is well-determined and will guarantee only distant approaches beyond  of Jupiter over the next 146 years. The asteroid will also pass  from Mars on 9 May 2107. Nominally the asteroid will not approach 1 AU from Earth until April 2332.

Notes

References

Sources

External links
2022 AP7 at Minor Planet Center

Minor planet object articles (unnumbered)
20220113